"Man of War" is a song by the English rock band Radiohead, released as a download on 22 June 2017. Radiohead wrote it during the sessions for their second album, The Bends (1995), and performed it on the Bends tour. In this period, the singer, Thom Yorke, described it as a homage to James Bond themes. Radiohead worked on "Man of War" during the sessions for their third album, OK Computer (1997), and worked on a version for the 1998 film The Avengers, but abandoned the recordings.

Years later, Radiohead submitted "Man of War" for the 2015 James Bond film Spectre, but it was rejected as it had not been written for the film. It remained unreleased until 2017, when it was included on the OK Computer reissue OKNOTOK 1997 2017.

History

"Man of War", which had the working title "Big Boots", was written during the sessions for Radiohead's second album The Bends (1995). Radiohead performed it several times on tour in 1995. The singer, Thom Yorke, said it was a "melodramatic" homage to James Bond themes; on the same tour, Radiohead covered "Nobody Does It Better", the theme from the 1977 Bond film The Spy Who Loved Me. Radiohead considered recording "Man of War" as a B-side for the Bends single "Street Spirit (Fade Out)", and recorded a version in the first sessions for their third album, OK Computer (1997), with their producer, Nigel Godrich. However, the song went unreleased.

In March 1998, Radiohead and Godrich recorded a version containing electronic elements in Abbey Road Studios for the 1998 spy film The Avengers, but this was abandoned. Footage of the session appears in the 1998 documentary Meeting People Is Easy. Yorke said: "We were so messed up and we went in, tried to do the track, but we just couldn't do it. It was actually a really difficult period of time. We had a five-week break and all the shit was coming to the surface ... It was a real low point after it."

Years later, Radiohead were commissioned to write the theme song for the 2015 James Bond film Spectre, and submitted "Man of War". In September 2015, the conductor Robert Ziegler, who had worked with Radiohead on their 2011 album The King of Limbs, tweeted photos of the band recording with the Royal Philharmonic Orchestra. The Spectre production team liked the song, but rejected it when they discovered it had not been written for the film and so would be ineligible for the Academy Award for Best Original Song. The director, Sam Mendes, said that "you want to feel like it's written just for the movie". 

Radiohead suspended work on their ninth album, A Moon Shaped Pool (2016), to record another song for the film, "Spectre", but this was rejected as too melancholy. In June 2017, Radiohead released "Man of War" on the OK Computer reissue OKNOTOK 1997 2017 alongside two other previously unreleased tracks: "I Promise" and "Lift".

Composition 
Rolling Stone described "Man of War" as a "crisp mid-tempo ballad" with strings, piano, and "shards of distressed electric guitar". It opens with a guitar figure before a distorted chorus. The lyrics are "anxious" and "nerve-racking", with the refrain "the worms will come for you".

Music video 
The "Man of War" music video, directed by Colin Read, was released in June 2017 on YouTube. The video alternates from day to night, with the mood shifting from "cheerful to paranoid". It follows a man walking from a park who appears carefree by day but "seems to be hiding something" at night.

Reception 
PopMatters praised "Man of War" as the strongest of the new tracks released on OKNOTOK, and argued that it could have appeared on the original OK Computer. The PopMatters critics awarded it an average score of 8.3 out of 10. Drowned in Sound described it as "grandiose-bordering-on-OTT" and the "opposite" of Radiohead's other Bond theme, "Spectre".

Personnel

Radiohead
Colin Greenwood 
Jonny Greenwood 
Ed O'Brien 
Philip Selway
Thom Yorke

Additional personnel
Royal Philharmonic Orchestra  – strings
Chris Blair – mastering
Stanley Donwood – illustrations
Nigel Godrich – production, engineering
Robert Ziegler - conducting
Sam Petts Davis, Fiona Cruickshank – engineering
Jim Warren – production, engineering

Charts

References

2017 songs
Radiohead songs
Song recordings produced by Nigel Godrich
Songs written by Thom Yorke
Songs written by Jonny Greenwood
Songs written by Colin Greenwood
Songs written by Ed O'Brien
Songs written by Philip Selway
XL Recordings singles